Acianthera sulphurea is a species of orchid plant native to Brazil.

References 

sulphurea
Endemic orchids of Brazil